The Pioneer Total Abstinence Association of the Sacred Heart (PTAA) is an international organisation for Roman Catholic teetotalers that is based in Ireland.   Its members are commonly called Pioneers.  While the PTAA does not advocate prohibition, it does require of its members complete abstinence from alcoholic drink.  It also encourages devotion to the Sacred Heart of Jesus as an aid to resisting the temptation of alcohol.  Pioneers wear a lapel pin called a Pioneer pin with an image of the Sacred Heart, both to advertise the organisation and to alert others not to offer them alcohol.  The association publishes a monthly magazine, The Pioneer.

History
The PTAA was founded in 1898 by James Cullen, in response to widespread alcoholism among Irish Catholics as the earlier temperance movement of Father Mathew was fading from memory.  In the 20th Century, the term Pioneer became synonymous with teetotalism among Irish Catholics, and the PTAA influenced public policy.  In 1923, Eoin O'Duffy as Commissioner of the Garda Síochána (Civic Guard) encouraged members to join the PTAA, and allowed Gardaí to wear the Pioneer pin on their uniforms, in exemption to a general ban on symbols and adornments. The Irish Defence Forces also allow its personnel to wear the Pioneer pin on their uniforms, one of only two civilian symbols allowed to be worn in uniform, the other being the Fáinne. By 1948, the PTAA claimed 360,000 members.  In 1956, a Commission of Enquiry into the licensing laws in the Republic of Ireland was appointed by the Minister for Justice, James Everett; the PTAA nominated one of the 22 members, John K. Clear.  Clear assented to the majority report of the Commission, which favoured easing the (widely disregarded) restrictions on opening hours of public houses introduced in 1925, although the Catholic hierarchy subsequently opposed the resulting Act.

Activity
Roman Catholic children in Ireland who make their Confirmation (typically at the age of 11–12) are encouraged to promise, or "take the pledge", not to drink alcohol until they are at least 18 (the legal drinking age in Ireland).  The PTAA is active in this drive, and encourages teenagers, particularly in religious-run secondary schools, to join the PTAA and "keep the pledge".  In spite of these efforts, underage drinking is widespread in Ireland.  In train with the growing secularisation of Irish society, members of the association are increasingly older people. Younger Catholics who choose not to drink alcohol are unlikely to belong to the PTAA.

The PTAA does not strive to simply stop people from drinking. It also aims to create opportunities for fun and social activities without the need for the presence of alcohol. It organises many competitions, such as table quizzes, Réadóirí (a talent competition; Réadóirí is the Irish word for Pioneers), and sports. Local centres (parishes or schools) compete in these competitions at regional (against local parishes), diocesan, provincial and all-Ireland level. The Pioneers also run two annual seminars, one for young pioneers (13-18), and one for older Pioneers (18+).

The Association issued an appeal for funds from its website in April 2011 in an effort to prevent closure because of the organisation's indebtedness.

References

Further reading

External links
 Official website
 Ulster Provincial website
 Jesuit PTAA web page

1898 establishments in Ireland
Organizations established in 1898
Catholic Church in Ireland
Religious organisations based in Ireland
Temperance organizations
Christian temperance movement